Mauvezin may refer to several communes in France:

 Mauvezin, Haute-Garonne
 Mauvezin, Gers
 Mauvezin, Hautes-Pyrénées
 Mauvezin-d'Armagnac, in the Landes department
 Mauvezin-de-Prat, in the Ariège department
 Mauvezin-de-Sainte-Croix, in the Ariège department
 Mauvezin-sur-Gupie, in the Lot-et-Garonne department